Nelson Freitas (born April 4, 1975) is a Cape Verdean-Dutch singer, producer and recorder.  He records with GhettoZouk Music, which also signed artists Chelsy Shantel and William Araujo.

Biography

Freitas was born in the Netherlands to Cape Verdean parents. His music features Cape Verdean zouk (a style combined with kizomba) and R&B.  His first record was with a boy's band called "Quatro Plus" (IV), a zouk/R&B band which was formed with Nilton Ramalho, Nelson Oliveira and Adilson Ben David.

The group released their first tracks on the album MOBASS presents..., "Hoje em Dia" ("Nowadays"), plus three albums 4-Voz (Four Voices) in 1998 including the single "Si bo cre", then as Quatro+ with Edson Freitas, his brother included.  Bem Consché in 2002 (with additional singles that became hits including "Kazanga") and ("Última Viagem") ("Last Journey") in 2004.

Nelson released his first solo album, titled Magic, in October 2006, with songs in English and Cape Verdean Creole (some featuring Vanessa da Mata and Ben Harper). It was the greatest success of the year in the kizomba genre of music.  His second album, My Life, was released in 2010 and includes "Rebound Chick" and appearances by William Araujo, Mc Knowledje, Sanches Laisa and Anselmo Ralph.  His third album was Elevate in 2013. Some tracks features C4 Pedro on "Bo Tem Mel", a Creole song; Djodje on "Bem Pa Mi" in another Creole song; Anselmo Ralph on "Drinks on Me" and Eddy Parker and Crucial in "All Upon You". The sixth track, "Simple Girl", featured a music video that was awarded Best Video at the 2013 Cabo Verde Music Awards.

His most recent release was Four, in 2016. Its tracks feature Portuguese singer Richie Campbell on "Break of Dawn"; another Cape Verdean singer, Mayra Andrade, on "Nha Baby"; Loony Johnson on "That's Why I Love You" and Mikkel Solnado on "In My Feelings", "Miúda Linda", its final track, is a remix.

Freitas is currently signed to the label named Believe.

Discography

with "Quatro Plus"

Solo albums

Other titles
 "Sienna" (single released in 2010, unreleased)
 "For You" (title released in 2014, unreleased)
 "Miúda Linda" (title released in 2015, unrecorded)
 "Break of Dawn" ft. Richie Campbell (title released in 2016, unreleased)

Collections and compilations

Collaborations
Carlos Silva ft Nelson Freitas & Eddie Parker - Mystery 
Carlos Silva ft Nelson Freitas & Q-Plus - Cré Sabe 2008 
Atim - Crazy (ft Nelson Freitas)
Atim - Amor E Bo (ft Nelson Freitas)
Leroy Styles ft Nelson Freitas - Tao Sabe
Anselmo Ralph -  Assumir Barulho ft. Nelson Freitas (2009)
Anselmo Ralph - Atira Água Ft Nelson Freitas & Eddy Parke (2012)
Mark. G & The Heavy Hitters - I Wish (ft Nelson Freitas)
Just Jay ft Nelson Freitas: One Night Stand
Baby ft Kempi & Nelson Freitas - Meisje Zonder Naam 
Kizomba Brasil, 2 duos with Chelsy Shantel: Boa Sorte (Good Luck) (song by Vanessa da Mata & Ben Harper) and Amor Perfeito (2008)
Eddu ft Nelson Freitas - N'cre xinti bu corpo (2008)
Team De Sonh: Big Nelo ft Nelson Freitas - Ela é (2012), title which Freitas recorded in the solo under the title "King Of The World"
Johnny Ramos ft Nelson Freitas - One Night Stand
Stony - Let's Do It Now (ft Nelson Freitas) (zouk 2012)
TLDreamZ - Sem Bu Amor (ft Nelson Freitas) (Album Press Play, 2012)
Jennifer Dias - Deixam em paz (ft Nelson Freitas) (remix)
Kaysha ft Nelson Freitas & Big Nelo - She's Dangerous (2013)
Chachi Carvalho - So Fly ft Nelson Freitas
Dji Tafinha - Vou Te Dar ft Ary & Nelson Freitas (2014)
C4 Pedro ft. Nelson Freitas: Come Right Now (2015)
William Araujo - Calor Ki Ta Mata (ft. Nelson Freitas & Broederliefde) [Verão Azul] (2016)
Kaysha feat. Nelson Freitas - I Will (Tarraxinha) (2017)
Telma Lee - Esta dificil (feat. Nelson Freitas ) (2017)
June Freedom & Nelson Freitas - Dor d'um Kriolu (2020)

References

External links
Official website
Page on Nelson Freita on the label Believe

1975 births
Living people
21st-century Cape Verdean male singers
Dutch people of Cape Verdean descent
Musicians from Rotterdam
20th-century Dutch male singers
21st-century Dutch male singers
21st-century Dutch singers